= Burkinabé Football Federation =

Governing body of football in Burkina Faso

CAF
- Founded: 1959
- FIFA affiliation: 1964
- CAF affiliation: 1964
- President: Lazare Bansse
- Website: https://fbf.bf

The Burkinabé Football Federation (French: Fédération Burkinabé de Football, FBF) is the governing body of football in Burkina Faso. Their offices are based in the capital city of Ouagadougou. The president of the federation is Sita Sangaré.

== History ==
It was founded in 1959 and affiliated to FIFA and to CAF in 1964. It organizes the national football league and the national team.

== Staff ==
- President: Lazare Bansse
- Vice President: Laurent Blaise Kaboré
- General Secretary: Boureima Balima
- Treasurer: Idrissa Kafando
- Technical Director: Ousmane Savadogo
- Men's Coach: [Paulo Duarte]
- Media Officer: Gabriel Nacoulma
- Referee Coordinator: David Yaméogo
